Gowarczów  is a village in Końskie County, Świętokrzyskie Voivodeship, in south-central Poland. It is the seat of the gmina (administrative district) called Gmina Gowarczów. The village has a population of 1,400.

The history of Gowarczów dates back to the late Middle Ages, when a defensive gord was established here in the 12th century. In the 14th century, Gowarczów became the seat of a Roman Catholic parish church, and in 1430, the village received Magdeburg rights from King Wladyslaw Jagiello, upon request of its owner Krystyna Magara. Soon afterwards, Gowarczow became property of the Bninski family. It remained a small town, whose residents were mostly farmers. Until the Partitions of Poland, it belonged to the Opoczno County of the Sandomierz Voivodeship, and in 1662 its population was 374.

In the second half of the 18th century, the Jablonowski family built here a bloomery, later a blast furnace. Soon afterwards, Gowarczów became part of Russian-controlled Congress Poland, and in 1869, following the January Uprising, it was stripped of its town charter. The village has a St. Peter and Paul parish church from the 14th century. It was remodelled in ca. 1640, and partly burned in a 1767 fire. The church was rebuilt and expanded in 1902-1904.

References

Villages in Końskie County
Lesser Poland
Sandomierz Voivodeship
Radom Governorate
Kielce Voivodeship (1919–1939)
Łódź Voivodeship (1919–1939)